A mesoangioblast is a mesenchymal-like cell, associated with the walls of the large vessels. Mesoangioblasts exhibit many similarities to pericytes found in the small vessels.  Mesoangioblasts are relatively undifferentiated cells with the potential to progress down the endothelial or mesodermal lineages.  Mesoangioblasts express the endothelial marker KDR (FLK1), but not haematopoietic markers such as TAL1.

Research has suggested their application for stem cell therapies for muscular dystrophy.  Experiments in alpha-sarcoglycan deficient dystrophic mice have shown that mesoangioblast transplantation can restore muscle function. Cells are delivered intra-arterially, where they migrate to the muscles.

In a 2006 study, mesoangioblast transplantion was used to ameliorate the effects of muscular dystrophy in golden retrievers with a congenital muscular dystrophy.  The dogs given allogeneic cells survived; control animals died within 1 year.

See also 

 Pericyte
 Mesoderm
 Endothelium
 List of human cell types derived from the germ layers

References

External links

Contractile cells
Animal cells